The 1922 AAA Championship Car season consisted of 18 races, beginning in Beverly Hills, California on March 5 and concluding in the same location on December 13.  There were also 2 non-championship races.  The AAA National Champion and Indianapolis 500 winner was Jimmy Murphy.

Schedule and results
All races running on Dirt/Brick/Board Oval.

Leading National Championship standings

References

See also
 1922 Indianapolis 500

AAA Championship Car season
AAA Championship Car
1922 in American motorsport